Senator Tanner may refer to:

Gloria Tanner (born 1935), Colorado State Senate
John Riley Tanner (1844–1901), Illinois State Senate
William Elam Tanner (1836–1896), Virginia State Senate